Faccombe is a village and civil parish in Hampshire, England. The village lies on the Hampshire-Berkshire border and is situated on the North Downs.

The village was originally called "Faccombe Upstrete" in medieval times to distinguish it from Netherton, Hampshire, a village lower in the valley.

The village has an inn, The Jack Russell Inn.

Landmarks
A large part of the parish is part of the Faccombe Estate which is used for shooting and includes a wind turbine. The estate was formerly owned by Brigadier Timothy Landon.

The parish includes parts, although not the summits, of Combe Hill and Pilot Hill. Pilot Hill is the county top of Hampshire.

Governance
The village is part of the civil parish of Faccombe and is part of the Bourne Valley ward of Test Valley District Council. The district council is a Non-metropolitan district of Hampshire County Council.

References

Villages in Hampshire
Test Valley